Adipiplon (developmental code name NG2-73) is an anxiolytic drug developed by Neurogen Corporation. It has similar effects to benzodiazepine drugs, but is structurally distinct and so is classed as a nonbenzodiazepine anxiolytic. 

Adipiplon is a subtype-selective GABAA receptor partial agonist, which binds preferentially to the α3 subtype. This is significant as while several previous nonbenzodiazepine drugs have been developed that are selective for α2/3 over the other subtypes, adipiplon is one of the first drugs selected for clinical development which is able to discriminate between α2 and α3, as well as showing little affinity for the α1 or α5 subtypes - alpidem is selective for α3 over α2, but still has moderate affinity for α1, whereas adipiplon is highly α3-selective with little affinity for either α1, α2 or α5. 

Adipiplon is being researched as a potential medication for the treatment of anxiety and insomnia, and in 2008 it was being used in Phase IIb trials. These trials were suspended after significant next-day side effects were discovered.

See also 
 Nonbenzodiazepine

References 

Anxiolytics
Triazolopyrimidines
Imidazoles
Pyridines
Fluoroarenes
GABAA receptor positive allosteric modulators